This is a list of Kentucky companies which includes notable companies that are headquartered in Kentucky, or were previously headquartered in Kentucky.

Companies based in Kentucky

0–9
 21c Museum Hotels

A
 A&W Restaurants 
 Alltech 
 Ashland Inc. 
 AssuredPartners NL 
 Atlas Machine and Supply, Inc. 
 Atria Senior Living

B
 B & H Tool Works 
 Bearno's 
 Big Ass Fans 
 Block Starz Music 
 Blood-Horse Publications 
 Bluegrass Brewing Company 
 Broadbent's
 Brown–Forman 
 Buffalo Trace Distillery

C
 C.I.Agent Solutions 
 CafePress 
 Caldwell Tanks 
 Columbia Sussex
 Commonwealth Credit Union
 Crosley Radio

D
 D.D. Williamson 
 Dippin' Dots 
 Doe-Anderson Inc.

E
 Ebonite International 
 Equix 
 Exstream Software

F
 Fazoli's 
 Florida Tile 
 Forcht Group of Kentucky
 Four Roses 
 Fruit of the Loom

G
 GE Appliances 
 General Cable 
 Gilliam Candy Company 
 Graf Brothers Flooring and Lumber

H
 Heaven Hill 
 Heine Brothers' 
 Hillerich & Bradsby 
 Hilliard Lyons 
 Hitcents 
 Holley Performance Products 
 Houchens Industries 
 Humana

I
 i-wireless 
 Intech Contracting

J
 Jif 
 Jim Beam 
 Joseph & Joseph 
 Jr. Food Stores

K
 Kentucky Peerless Distilling Company 
 KFC
 Kindred Healthcare 
 Kinetic theTechnologyAgency 
 Kona Ice

L
 Lexmark 
 LG&E and KU Energy 
 Lincoln Industries 
 Long John Silver's 
 Louisville Bats 
 Louisville Gas & Electric 
 Louisville Stoneware
 Louisville Water Company 
 Luckett & Farley

M
 Maker's Mark 
 Mammoth Resource Partners 
 Marmon-Herrington 
 Modern Welding Company, Inc.
Mayfield Consumer Products

N
 Naval Ordnance Station Louisville
 New Kolb Aircraft 
 Norton Healthcare

O
 Ohio Valley Wrestling 
 Ouibox

P
 Papa John's Pizza 
 Paxton Media Group 
 PharMerica 
 Presbyterian Publishing Corporation 
 Purple House Press

R
 R.J. Corman Railroad Group 
 Republic Bank & Trust Company

S
 Safetran 
 Sargent and Greenleaf 
 SHPS 
 SITEX Corporation 
 SonaBLAST! Records 
 Stewart Iron Works 
 Stites & Harbison

T
 Tempur-Pedic 
 Texas Roadhouse 
 Themeparks LLC 
 Thorntons Inc. 
 Town Branch 
 Tumbleweed Tex Mex Grill & Margarita Bar

U
 Unicomp 
 United States Playing Card Company 
 UPS Airlines

W
 Waterfront Development Corporation 
 Westminster John Knox Press 
 Wild Flavors 
 Wild Turkey 
 Willett Distillery 
 Woodford Reserve 
 WTII Records 
 Wyatt, Tarrant & Combs

Y
 Yum! Brands

Z
 ZFX Inc. 
 ZOOperstars!

Companies formerly based in Kentucky

B
 Brown & Williamson

C
 Camping World
 Comair

G
 GameZnFlix

J
 J. Peterman Company

L
 Local TV LLC
 Louis Trauth Dairy

O
 Omnicare

R
 Royal Photo Company

S
 Stonestreet One

T
 Thiel Audio 
 Toyota Motor Engineering & Manufacturing North America

U
 U.S. Cavalry Store

See also
 List of companies in Greater Cincinnati

Kentucky